Gaston Emergency Medical Services (GEMS) is the Emergency Medical Service for Gaston County, North Carolina. This is the Emergency Service Provided by the County, 24 hours a day, 365 days a year. They respond to 35,000 calls annually. The service provides advanced life support. GEMS was the first EMS organization within the State of North Carolina to achieve national accreditation through the Commission on Accreditation of Ambulance Services (CAAS). GEMS has 9 paramedic stations & 10 ems post throughout the county. Gaston Emergency Medical Service headquarters is located in Gastonia, North Carolina. GEMS primarily transports patients to CaroMont Regional Medical Center and other outlying facilities in neighboring counties.

GEMS is also supported by the local rescue squads throughout the county. These include South Point Lifesaving Crew (now defunct), Stanley Civil Defense Rescue, Dallas Rescue, Ranlo Fire and Rescue, Gaston Lifesaving Crew (now defunct), Crowders Mountain Rescue, Cherryville Rescue (now defunct), And the local fire departments that respond to medical calls.

Special teams

Bicycle Emergency Response Team (B.E.R.T)
Dive Rescue and Recovery Team
Honor Guard
S.T.A.R. Team (Specialized Tactics and Rescue Team)
Tactical Medic Team
Structural Collapse and Trench (S.C.A.T)
Personnel Rehab Unit (P.R.U)
 Gems Explorers Team 

GEMS has 11 stations

External links

Ambulance services in the United States
Medical and health organizations based in North Carolina